Diets-Heur (French: Heure-le-Tixhe) is a village and deelgemeente of Tongeren in the province of Limburg, Flemish region, Belgium. Diets-Heur is a small, rural village with a population of 362 people in 2017.

History
Diets-Heur was first mentioned in 1258 as Eure, and was sometimes referred to as Ora Teutonica. Two Roman villas have been discovered near the village. In 1795, the village became an independent municipality. In 1970, Diets-Heur merged into the municipality of Vreren which in turn merged into Tongeren in 1977.

During the 20th century, the village became a residential village for commuters with some agriculture.

References

External links

Populated places in Limburg (Belgium)
Tongeren
Former municipalities of Limburg (Belgium)